People's Liberation Army General Logistics Department (GLD) is a former chief organ under China's Central Military Commission. It organizes and leads the logistics construction and oversees housing, supplies, hospitals, and barracks of the People's Liberation Army.

Its directors included Yang Lisan (1949-53), Huang Kecheng (1954-56), Hong Xuezhi (1956-59), Qiu Huizuo (1959), Zhang Zhen (?1960-75?), Zhang Zongxun (1975), Hong Xuezhi (1980-87), Zhao Nanqi (1988-92), Fu Quanyou (1992-94), Wang Ke (1995-?), Zhao Keshi. Its  political commissars included Huang Kecheng, Yu Qiuli, Li Jukui, Zhang Chiming, Guo Linxiang, Wang Ping, Hong Xuezhi, Liu Anyuan, Zhou Keyu, Zhou Kunren, Zhang Wentai, Sun Dafa, and Liu Yuan.

The department was disbanded in January 2016 and the new agency, Logistic Support Department of the Central Military Commission was founded.

References

People's Liberation Army
Military logistics units and formations of China